Macron may refer to:

People
 Emmanuel Macron (born 1977), president of France since 2017
 Brigitte Macron (born 1953), French teacher, wife of Emmanuel Macron
 Jean-Michel Macron (born 1950), French professor of neurology, father of Emmanuel Macron
 Ptolemy Macron (fl. 2nd century BCE), Seleucid general and governor

Science
 Macron (gastropod), a genus of sea snails
 Macron (physics), high-energy particle

Typography
 Macron (diacritic), a straight bar placed over a letter
 Macron below, a macron placed below a letter
 Overline, a horizontal line over two or more letters, sometimes mistakenly called a macron

Other
 Macron (sportswear), an Italian sportswear manufacturer
 Macron Stadium, a former name of University of Bolton Stadium, home to Bolton Wanderers F.C. in Horwich, Lancashire, England
 Macron 1, the name of the North American version of GoShogun, a Japanese anime series

See also
 
 Underscore (disambiguation)
 Macro (disambiguation)
 Makron (disambiguation)
 Marcon (disambiguation)
 Micron (disambiguation)
 Macaron, a type of meringue-based sweet confection
 Macaroon, a type of cake